Heihei or hei hei may refer to:

Hei Hei, a suburb of Christchurch, New Zealand, whose name comes from Māori  "chicken"
"Hei hei", a song on the 2014 album Ikuiset lapset
"Heihei", an 2010 episode of Hawaii Five-0
Heihei, the drummer of Hong Kong band GDJYB
Heihei, the pet rooster of the main character in the 2016 film Moana
HeiHei, a roast chicken retail chain managed by Bounty Agro Ventures

See also
Heihe, a city in Heilongjiang, China
Hey Hey (disambiguation)